Omnis Mundi Creatura is a single released by electro-medieval/darkwave band Helium Vola. It was released in 2001 by Chrom Records.

The lyrics of the song are entirely in Latin. They are copied from a 12th-century text by the neo-Platonist Alain de Lile:

Omnis mundi creatura quasi liber et pictura nobis est in speculum: nostrae vitae, nostrae mortis, nostri status, nostrae sortis fidele signaculum.

[All the world's creatures, as a book and a picture, are to us as a mirror: in it our life, our death, our present condition and our passing are faithfully signified.]

Track listing
 "Omnis Mundi Creatura (Album Version)" – 6:06
 "Minne Und Treue" – 4:44
 "Fama Tuba" – 4:36
 "Omnis Mundi Creatura (Radio Version)" – 4:09

Credits
Ernst Horn - Keyboards & production
Sabine Lutzenberger - vocals
Additional singers - Gerlinde Sämann, Susan Weiland, Andreas Hirtreiter, Tobias Schlierf
Lyrics - Traditional
Composed by Ernst Horn

References

External links
 
 Wikisource: Omnis mundi creatura

2001 songs